Hübl Peak is a peak west of Stolze Peak on Arctowski Peninsula, on the west coast of Graham Land, Antarctica. It was mapped by the Falkland Islands Dependencies Survey from photos taken by Hunting Aerosurveys Ltd in 1956–57, and was named by the UK Antarctic Place-Names Committee in 1960 for Artur Freiherr von Hübl (1853–1932), an Austrian surveyor who was head of the topographic section of the Militärgeographisches Institut, Vienna, and in 1894 designed a stereocomparator which was developed independently by Dr. Carl Pulfrich in 1901.

References

Mountains of Graham Land
Danco Coast